Ebenezer Hills Jr. Farmhouse is a historic home located at Colonie in Albany County, New York.  It was built about 1785 and is a two-story, five bay center hall plan frame farmhouse on a stone foundation.  It features a one-story porch with a shed roof built about 1860 and supported by simple square columns and decorative brackets.  Also on the property are three barns, a shed, and greenhouse.

It was listed on the National Register of Historic Places in 1985.

References

Houses on the National Register of Historic Places in New York (state)
Houses completed in 1785
Houses in Albany County, New York
National Register of Historic Places in Albany County, New York